The Heliomonadida (formerly Dimorphida) are a small group of heliozoan amoeboids that are unusual in possessing flagella throughout their life cycle.

Classification
Genetic studies place them among the Cercozoa, a group including various other flagellates that form filose pseudopodia. This order has recently been placed into the new class of naked filose cercozoans called Granofilosea.
There are two genera in this order: 
 Heliomorpha, a tiny organism found in freshwater
 the larger Tetradimorpha, which is distinguished by having four rather than two flagella.

Morphology
Bundles of microtubules, typically in square array, arise from a body near the flagellar bases and support the numerous axopods that project from the cell surface.

Dimorphids have a single nucleus, and mitochondria with tubular cristae.

References

Granofilosea
Cercozoa orders
Amoeboids
Taxa named by Thomas Cavalier-Smith